Gale Township is a township in Marion County, Kansas, United States.  As of the 2010 census, the township population was 219, including Canada and Eastshore.

Geography
The Marion Reservoir is located in the township.

Cities and towns
The township contains the following settlements:
 Unincorporated community of Canada.
 Unincorporated community of Eastshore.

Cemeteries
The township contains the following cemeteries:
 Brunk Cemetery (no longer in use), located in Section 31 T19S R3E.
 Canada Cemetery, located in Section 28 T19S R3E.
 Mennonite Church Ebenezer of Bruderthal Cemetery (in 1965 while Marion Reservoir was built, it was moved to "Haven of Rest" in Liberty Township), located in Section 19 T19S R3E.
 Strassburg Cemetery, located in Section 14 T19S R3E.

References

Further reading

External links
 Marion County website
 City-Data.com
 Marion County maps: Current, Historic, KDOT

Townships in Marion County, Kansas
Townships in Kansas